Alberto Pellegrino (20 May 1930 – 9 March 1996) was an Italian fencer. He won two gold and two silver medals with the Italian épée and foil teams at the 1956, 1960 and 1964 Olympic Games.

References

External links 

 
 

1930 births
1996 deaths
Italian male fencers
Olympic fencers of Italy
Fencers at the 1956 Summer Olympics
Fencers at the 1960 Summer Olympics
Fencers at the 1964 Summer Olympics
Olympic gold medalists for Italy
Olympic silver medalists for Italy
Olympic medalists in fencing
Sportspeople from Tunis
Medalists at the 1956 Summer Olympics
Medalists at the 1960 Summer Olympics
Medalists at the 1964 Summer Olympics